Brontochion Monastery is a monastery in Mystras, Greece.

The abbot Pachomius incorporated into it the small church of the Hodegetria, or "Aphentikon", as the monastery's catholicon. The church was reconstructed and completed around 1310, with some scholars giving 1308-1312 as the construction dates and others 1310–1322. The despot Theodore I Palaiologos, who died in 1407, is buried here.

During Ottoman rule, the monastery was converted into a mosque.

See also 
 History of Roman and Byzantine domes

References 

Byzantine monasteries in Greece
14th-century Eastern Orthodox church buildings
Mystras
Buildings and structures in Laconia
Mosques converted from churches in Ottoman Greece
Former mosques in Greece